Chris Ohlson (born August 24, 1975) is an American video artist and director based in Brooklyn, New York.

Ohlson's thoughtfully provocative work often explores and dissects our memory of time—how we perceive, formulate, edit and curate our own reality. His films and videos make use of auditory, visual, and experiential collage—from snippets of conversations with intimates and strangers, to voiceover, archival imagery, found footage and orchestral sound design. Ohlson works diligently and sensitively at exploring his own mortality—the what, if anything, it means to be alive, and how in the not-knowing-precisely-the-meaning-of-our-lives, we choose to present ourselves in all our manifest and mundane glory.

Ohlson is the 2015 Independent Spirit Piaget Producers Award winner, a 2013 Creative Producing Fellow of The Sundance Institute, and an alum of IFP's Narrative Lab Program.

Career

The Overbrook Brothers 

Ohlson's first film as a producer, John Bryant's The Overbrook Brothers, screened in competition at SXSW in 2009. The film went on to play at numerous festivals around the world before being distributed by IFC Films. Ain't It Cool News called The Overbrook Brothers, "Delightful…a smart and funny film."

The Happy Poet 

Following the success of The Overbrook Brothers, Ohlson executive produced The Happy Poet, which screened at more than 50 domestic and international festivals, (including the 67th Venice Film Festival) and earned critical praise from Entertainment Weekly, The New York Times, and other publications. The Village Voice called it "A sweet, stealthy film about creating meaning in your life (and your work) in a relentlessly mercenary world. Off-handed and yet quite artfully observed, The Happy Poet's winsome deadpan offsets its skewering of class and sustainability issues, right through to a tricky ending that, like Bill himself, may not be what it seems." The Happy Poet won numerous prizes around the world, including the Audience Award at the Oldenburg International Film Festival, an American Independents Award at The Philadelphia International Film Festival and the Grand Jury Prize for Best Narrative Feature at the Florida Film Festival.

Lovers of Hate 

In 2010, Ohlson served as a co-producer on Bryan Poyser's Lovers of Hate, which World Premiered at the 2010 Sundance Film Festival in the U.S. Dramatic Competition. Karina Longworth of LA Weekly dubbed it "the most exciting American indie I've seen in a while", and The New York Times called it "viciously amusing". The film was nominated for a John Cassavetes Independent Spirit Award.

Good Night 

Ohlson also served as an executive producer on Good Night, starring Adriene Mishler, Jonny Mars, Alex Karpovsky and Chris Doubek. Good Night was called "lovely and devastating" by Indiewire, and Film Threat noted, "The true strength of Good Night is the top-notch ensemble cast. Throw Alex Karpovsky, Todd Berger, Newman and Chris Doubek into a room together and some sort of cinematic magic is going to happen; but there is also no doubt that it is the emotionally dynamic duo of Adriene Mishler and Jonny Mars who turn Good Night into something that is truly special. I might even say that Mishler and Mars clock in two of the greatest dramatic performances in the history of Austin filmmaking." Good Night had its World Premiere in 2013 at the SXSW Film Festival and is distributed by Devolver Digital.

Kumiko, the Treasure Hunter 

Ohlson produced Kumiko, the Treasure Hunter, which made its world premiere on January 20, 2014, as part of the U.S. Dramatic Competition of the 2014 Sundance Film Festival. The film has gone on to screen at sold out venues at more than 30 festivals and markets around the world, including the 2014 Berlin International Film Festival, SXSW, Karlovy Vary, San Francisco and Sydney, among many others. Along the way, Kumiko has received a slew of awards, including a U.S. Dramatic Special Jury Award for Musical Score at Sundance, a Best Director Award at the 2014 Fantasia International Film Festival, a Screenwriting Award at the 2014 Nantucket Film Festival, and Audience Awards at both the Las Palmas (Spain) Film Festival and Little Rock Film Festival. The film was acquired by Amplify Releasing and will be released in 2015. Scott Foundas of Variety praised the film, saying "Our desire that life should be more like it is in the movies beats at the heart of Kumiko, the Treasure Hunter, a wonderfully strange and beguiling adventure." Rodrigo Perez of The Playlist wrote, "A kind of peculiar, intelligent fairy tale, the Zellner brothers magical Treasure Hunter leaves much to chew on... and much of this frosty and bracing expressionism will be a subjective experience. But either way, its ambiguity should dazzle and delight."

Thank You a Lot 

Ohlson also produced Thank You a Lot, the first film from writer/director, Matt Muir. The film premiered at the 2014 South by Southwest Film Festival to strong reviews, and was released in June 2014 by Gravitas Ventures. "Starring the inimitable James Hand and spot-on Blake DeLong," The Austin Chronicle wrote, "this is a story of regret, pride, and love that will stick with you long after the house lights have come back up."

She's Never Coming Back 
In 2022, Ohlson's short video She's Never Coming Back premiered at The Holy Art Gallery in London. It was later shown in Fluid Time at Independent & Image Art Space in China, and will be seen in Form 22 at the Czong Institute for Contemporary Art in Korea later this year.

The Man Who Plays With Fire 
In 2022, Ohlson produced and directed The Man Who Plays With Fire, an expressionistic profile that follows James Beard-nominated chef Bryce Shuman, and the live fire he cooks with. The film premiered on NOWNESS in 2022.

Filmography

References

External links 
 
 ChrisOhlson.com
 Ohlson selected for Sundance Institute's Creative Producing Labs
 IFP has announced the 10 projects selected for participation in this year's narrative edition of their Independent Filmmaker Labs
 IFC picks up SXSW hit The Overbrook Brothers
 Meet 2014 Sundance Producer: Chris Ohlson
 Austin at SXSW 2014
 2014 Sundance "Trading Cards" Series: #13. Chris Ohlson (Kumiko, The Treasure Hunter) 
 The Mentoring Mindset as A Key to Film Sustainability

Videos 
 How We Make Movies: Kumiko The Treasure Hunter on YouTube, 4 min.
 Producer Chris Ohlson - Digital Distribution on YouTube, 1 min.
 LPA Film Festival Awards on YouTube, 4 min.
 Sarasota Film Festival - Kumiko, the Treasure Hunter SFF 2014 Interview on YouTube, 8 min.

Living people
1975 births